The Garbage Bowl is a yearly Canadian football matchup that takes on January 1st each year in Montreal West, Quebec, Canada.  Overseen by the Montreal West Garbage Bowl Association, this match has taken place every year since 1950 on the Royal West Academy football field.

The match takes place between two teams, The Northern Combines and the Southern Bombers.  The players are not paid and volunteer their time and effort in order to raise donations.  Historically, the Northern Combines are made up of Montreal West residents living North of the CPR Crossing while the Southern Bombers are made up of those living South of it.  While this division isn't stresses very strongly now, it is the intent.  Many players have played the game yearly for upwards of 20 years and the age of players varies considerably between teenagers and those in their 50's. 

Proceeds from the game are donated to children's and youth organizations supported by the Montreal Westward Rotary Club.

Further reading
  
  
  
  

1950 establishments in Quebec
Recurring sporting events established in 1950